Siren Bay is a small bay formed by the configuration of the ice at the terminus of Shipley Glacier and the northwest side of Flat Island along the north coast of Victoria Land. Charted by the Northern Party, led by Campbell, of the British Antarctic Expedition, 1910–13, and so named by them because they heard a noise like a ship's siren while mapping this area.

Bays of Victoria Land
Pennell Coast